Arnaldo Freire is a Brazilian guitarist, teacher, cultural producer and composer.

Composition 
Arnaldo Freire is a graduate Consevatório Musical Guarulhos. He also studied at the Conservatory of Music and the Instituto Paulista Booklyn Souza . He is currently majoring in Composition course at the Federal University of Goiás – UFG. His composition "Apocalypse" for solo guitar was awarded by the Culture Secretariat of Goiania.

The award-winning short film Roxanne Towers “Catadores de Papel ", has original score by Arnaldo Freire.

Also has interests in soundtracks: “Entre Memórias e Conquistas”, “Umas e Outras” and “Maria da Gruta”, all directed by Lázaro Ribeiro.

In his compositions we see a refined Brazilianness: modinhas, frevos, sambas, valsas and other colors are mixed with post-tonal techniques, refined counterpoints and unusual instrumentation.

The work of composition is quoted in Arnaldo Freire Guia de Música Contemporânea Brasileira, edited by CDMC – Brasil / Unicamp, a subsidiary of the Centre de documentation de la musique contemporaine, based on Cité de la Musique, Parc de la Villette, in Paris.

Achille Picchi, Eduardo Escalante, Estércio Marquez, Odemar Brígido, Neder Nassaro and Frederico Richter has written concertos especially for the guitarist.

The success as a guitarist is now being recognized by foreign composers as Danielle Baas (Belgium), Harry Hewitt (USA), Naphtaly Lahav (Israel), Carlos Carmona (Argentina), Paulo Galvão (Portugal), that also devote plays and concerts.

Catalog summary  

The following is a brief catalog of works by Arnaldo Freire:
 OP. 01 – “RITUAL DA ALMA”, Prelude No. 01 for guitar.
 OP. 02 – “SAUDADE”, Prelude Nº02, for guitar.
 OP. 03 – “AR E MAR”, Prelude Nº03, for guitar.
 OP. 04 – “GLEISSON & LEYBER”, for 2 guitars.
 OP. 05 – “ENCONTRO DE RIOS”, Prelude Nº04, for guitar.
 OP. 06 – “CORREDEIRAS”, for 4 guitars.
 OP. 07 – “A BRUXA TIBETANA”, Prelude Nº05, for guitar.
 OP. 08 – “APOCALYPSE”, for guitar.
 OP. 09 – “O MONTE CINCO”, for string orchestra, inspired by the book by Paulo Coelho.
 OP. 10 – “SUÍTE EXPERIMENTAL”, quartet woods.
 OP. 11 – “IMPROVISO”, Prelude Nº06, for flute.
 OP. 12 – “SAÍDA PELA ESQUERDA”, country concertante for violin and cello.
 OP. 13 – “FUNK”, for flute.
 OP. 14 – “CONCERTO FESTIVO”, for guitar and orchestra.
 OP. 15 – “SUÍTE BRASILEIRA Nº01”, for flute and clarinet.
 OP. 16 – “FANTASIA CONCERTANTE”, for bass and piano.
 OP. 17 – “KALONI”, Prelude Nº07, for solo guitar.
 OP. 18 – “O LIVRO DE AMORES MODAIS”, for two voices, with poetry by Cristiano Siqueira.
 OP. 19 – “PROCISSÃO”, for oboe and strings.
 OP. 20 – “TRITONAL”, for 3 guitars.
 OP. 21 – “SUÍTE BRASILEIRA Nº2”, for piccolo and bass.
 OP. 22 – “A FLORESTA MÁGICA”, for bass and piano.
 OP. 23 – “PROSAS BÁRBARAS”, for symphony orchestra, based on the homonymous work by Eça de Queiroz.
 OP. 24 – “CAIXINHA DE MÚSICA”, for piano.
 OP. 25 – “SUÍTE BREVE”, for guitar.
 OP. 26 – “CANÇÕES SIMPLES”, for flute and guitar.
 OP. 27 – “BRIGA DE PÁSSAROS”, for guitar.
 OP. 28 – “O LIVRO DOS INSETOS”, for guitar.
 OP. 29 – “SUÍTE MÍSTICA” for flute.
 OP. 30 – “SUITE BRASILEIRA Nº3”, guitar quartet and wood.
 OP. 31 – “CONCERTINO”, for guitar, strings and percussion.
 OP. 32 – “O LIVRO DE SENTIMENTOS”, for 2 flutes.
 OP. 34 – “TRANSCENDÊNCIA” for mezzo-soprano and chamber orchestra, poetry Alexandra Machado
 OP. 35 – “SUÍTE”, for solo trumpet.
 OP. 36 – “O LIVRO DE VIAGENS Nº1”, for 2 basses.
 OP. 37 – “O LIVRO DE ADRIANA”, didactic series for solo bass (33 pieces).
 OP. 38 – “A HISTÓRIA DO CHORO”, for Flute and Guitar.
 OP. 39 – “CANTO”, for Soprano, Flute and Guitar. Song with poetry by Fernando Cruz.
 OP. 43 – “SUÌTE”, for Bassoon Solo.
 OP. 44 – “AS PAISAGENS QUE TROUXEMOS”, for soprano and string quartet, with the poetry of Fernando Cruz.
 OP. 45  – “SUÍTE PARA CLARINETA”.
 OP. 50 – “OS DOZE ESTUDOS”, for guitar.
 OP. 52 – “SUÍTE BRASILEIRA Nº4, for flute and string trio.
 OP. 54 – “SETE LEMBRANÇAS DE UM FLAUTIM”, for solo piccolo.
 OP. 58 – “CENAS BRASILEIRAS”, Duo for clarinet.
 OP. 59 – “PRELÚDIO, VALSA & FREVO”, for Oboe solo.
 OP. 67 – “CONCERTINO”, for trombone and strings.
 OP. 68 – “A FLORESTA DE BEATRIZ”, for harpsichord solo.
 OP. 70 – “O DERRADEIRO”, to band.
 OP. 72 – “Três Melodias Marianas”, for flute solo.

Teaching 

Arnaldo Freire's work as a teacher is very varied. Author of several methods for the guitar. Also teaches drums and bass.

Received honorable mention several times of the Municipal Sports, Culture and Recreation for their participation in the show “Violão e Violonistas Goianos”.

In 1996 writes produces and writes the video lesson “Ritmos”  setting a new standard in guitar group lessons.

Teaching for fifteen years in Goiania, Arnaldo Freire founded choral and guitar classes in colleges: Marista, Dinâmico, Disciplina, Maria Betânia, Agostiniano, COC e Olimpo.

Producing 

As a cultural producer, Arnaldo Freire created, sponsored by the College Dinâmico, the “Orquestra Planalto Central”. The composer Acchille Picchi wrote a piece for chorus and orchestra especially for it, Pascha Nostrum.

Also in 1999, recorded “Cenas da Floresta” with the orchestra's woodwind quintet. In 2002 launched the cd “O Violão em Goiás”.

He made the world premiere of “Oviedo Impressions”,  by Mary Ann Joyce Composers of the International Meeting on Poços de Caldas.

Playing 

As a guitarist Arnaldo Freire received several awards including the National Guitar Competition at the Faculty Mozarteum ( 88 ) and the Competition Nacional de Violão Souza Lima ( 96 ).

In 1995 Arnaldo Freire was the first musician to perform concert for Guitar and Orchestra in Goiás, conducted by Joaquim Jayme by the Symphony Orchestra of Goiânia.

Your Show “A Volta ao Mundo em Seis Cordas” is the instrumental music show most presented in Goiás (since 1995).

Contributions to contemporary repertoire 

 Achille Picchi (SP)
 Three Poetic Moments *
 Guitar & Symphony Orchestra
 Achille Picchi
 Three Parts
 Solo Guitar
 Achille Picchi
 Forest Scenes
 Wind Quintet
 Angélica Faria (RJ)
 The Three Faces of Love
 Flute, Guitar & Breakfast. Orchestra
 Calimério Soares (MG)
 Concertino
 Guitar, Brass & Percussion
 Fernando Lewis de Mattos (RS)
 Concert
 Guitar & Orchestra
 Estércio Márquez (GO)
 Concert Camera *
 Guitar & Breakfast. Orchestra
 Music for Flute and Guitar No. 1
 Music for Flute and Guitar No. 2
 Eduardo Escalante (SP)
 Concert *
 Guitar & Small Orchestra
 Concertante Nº3 **
 Flute, Guitar & Strings
 Frederico Richter (RS)
 Concerto No. 1 ***
 Guitar & Orchestra
 Concerto No. 2 ***
 Guitar & Orchestra
 Neder Nassaro (RJ)
 Concert
 Guitar & Strings
 Nestor de Holanda Cavalcanti (RJ)
 Three Folk Songs
 Guitar & String Quartet
 Odemar Brígido (RJ)
 Concert
 Guitar & Symphony Orchestra
 Pedro Cameron (SP)
 Concert
 Guitar & Strings
 Rodrigo Lima (SP)
 Variations
 Guitar & Strings
 Sérgio Vasconcelos-Corrêa (SP)
 Study No. 2
 Solo Guitar
 Wanderley Carlos Martins (SP)
 Quintet No. 1
 Wind Quintet

* – Presented by the Symphony Orchestra Goiânia.
** – Presented by the Orchestra of Ancient Cultural Foundation BH.
*** – Presented by the Symphony Orchestra Santa Maria – RS

References 

Living people
Brazilian guitarists
Brazilian male guitarists
Year of birth missing (living people)
Place of birth missing (living people)
Brazilian composers
Male composers
Federal University of Goiás alumni